The flag of the state of Iowa is a vertical tricolor flag designed by Dixie Cornell Gebhardt in 1917. Iowa, United States legislators officially adopted the flag in 1921.

History 
The State of Iowa did not have a banner for the first 75 years of its conception, largely because of calls for national unity during and after the American Civil War, in which Iowa fought for the Union. It was not until World War I that the creation of a state banner was requested, recorded first by the Iowa Daughters of the American Revolution (DAR), while Iowa National Guardsmen positioned along the Mexican border made several requests for a banner, as other states had banners to represent themselves. In 1917, Iowa was one of three states that had no banner.

The flag was designed by DAR member and Knoxville, Iowa resident Dixie Cornell Gebhardt, who was prompted to create the design by Iowa guardsmen. It was approved by the DAR flag committee in early May 1917 and presented to the Iowa State Council for Defense, where it was accepted on May 11, 1917. The flag was sent to Iowa troops for designation but would not be officially adopted as the state flag for nearly four more years.

Iowa governor William Lloyd Harding formally accepted the flag on behalf of the state on March 19, 1918, but legislative action on adoption failed in February 1919. Still, the Iowa Daughters met with legislators urging them to accept the flag again in September 1920, suggesting that past failures were caused by high expenses.

Despite not being adopted, the banner was used often throughout the nation to represent Iowa, notably in Continental Hall where it was among official flags of other states, though marked as unofficial. This was all the more reason to adopt the flag officially, according to the wife of congressman Horace Mann Towner.

Finally, in January 1921, Iowa legislators again deliberated on the adoption of an official banner, and by mid-March of that same year, the flag was accepted as law.

In 2001, a survey conducted by the North American Vexillological Association placed Iowa's flag 42nd in design quality out of the 72 Canadian provincial, U.S. state and U.S. territorial flags ranked.

Protocol and Procedure 
The banner is only to be used in official representation of the state of Iowa or in distinction between citizens of different states. The flag should always be flown below and “subservient” to the flag of the United States, while being provided and raised by public officers. Schools must fly the banner when classes are in session, and public buildings may fly the banner on secular days.

Design 
Iowa law officially describes the state flag.

Cornell Gebhardt assigned meaning to each color of the flag: blue represents loyalty, justice, and truth; white stands for purity; red symbolizes courage. The Des Moines Register suggested that the design hearkens back to Iowa's history as a French territory, with both flags containing blue, white and red from left to right, though Iowa's banner has a wider white section. The Register also stated that the word “Iowa” written in red symbolizes the “Iowa soldier [writing] in letters of blood on the white page of history his unalterable determination to defend the ideals represented by the banner and its wonderful motto."

It is one of eight U.S. state flags to feature an eagle, alongside those of Illinois, Michigan, New York, North Dakota, Oregon, Pennsylvania and Utah. The eagle carrying streamers in its beak also features on the Iowa state seal.

See also 

 Flag of Des Moines, Iowa
 List of Iowa state symbols
 Seal of Iowa

Sources 

Flags introduced in 1921
Canadian pale flags
Flags of Iowa
Flag
United States state flags
Flags displaying animals